Bondorabad (also Romanized as Bondorābād, Bandarābād, and Bondarābād) is a village in Rostaq Rural District, in the Central District of Saduq County, Yazd Province, Iran. At the 2006 census, its population was 738, in 213 families.

References 

Populated places in Saduq County